In July 1385 Richard II, king of England, led an English army into Scotland. The invasion was, in part, retaliation for Scottish border raids, but was most provoked by the arrival of a French army into Scotland the previous summer. England and France were engaged in the Hundred Years' War, and France and Scotland had a treaty to support each other. The English King had only recently come of age, and it was expected that he would play a martial role just as his father, Edward the Black Prince, and grandfather Edward III had done. There was some disagreement amongst the English leadership whether to invade France or Scotland; the King's uncle, John of Gaunt, favoured invading France, to gain him a tactical advantage in Castile, where he himself was technically king through his wife but had trouble asserting his claim. The King's friends among the nobility – who were also Gaunt's enemies – preferred an invasion of Scotland. A parliament the year before had granted funds for a continental campaign and it was deemed unwise to flout the House of Commons. The Crown could barely afford a big campaign. Richard summoned the feudal levy, which had not been called for many years; this was the last occasion on which it was to be summoned.

Richard promulgated ordinances to maintain discipline in his invasion force, but the campaign was beset by problems from the start. One of Richard's knights was killed by the king's half-brother before the army even reached Newcastle; once there, the leadership was divided and often indulged more in internecine fighting than in fighting against the Scots, who, with their French allies, had retired in the face of the English and refused battle. The Scots scorched the earth as they retired. The invaders swiftly exhausted their food and other supplies; by the time the English reached Edinburgh, they had achieved little of military value, mostly the burning of churches. Gaunt may have proposed chasing the Scots into the mountains to force them to battle, but the King refused to countenance such a tactic and the army soon withdrew to England. As Richard's force left Scotland, the Franco-Scottish army counter-invaded England from the West March getting almost as far as Carlisle and ravaged Cumbria and Durham on its return. Richard was to propose another invasion of Scotland a few years later, but this came to nothing; and on his next invasion, of Ireland in 1399, he was deposed by Gaunt's son, Henry Bolingbroke.

Background

The English government was hardly in a financial position to fight. Major English garrisons in Aquitaine, Brest, Calais and Cherbourg needed funding. Three out of the four most recent parliaments had refused to grant the King any subsidy at all. As a result, the Crown was unable to oppose the French resurgence and lost much of England's continental possessions. This policy has been blamed on Richard II's chancellor, Michael de la Pole, Earl of Suffolk, who was accused of following a policy of appeasement. In a major biography of the King, Historian Nigel Saul has commented on this that "military retrenchment was not so much a matter of choice for Chancellor Pole; it was forced upon him by circumstances".

King Richard's supporters, predominant among whom were the earls of Nottingham and Oxford, had fallen out the previous year with the King's uncle, John of Gaunt. The violent rupture gave credence to rumours that the King's friends intended to have the duke assassinated during a tournament). Their rift originated in differences over foreign policy. Whereas the council, meeting in December 1384, had been in favour of a military expedition to Scotland, Gaunt (and the Duke of Buckingham) had favoured France. Gaunt, and possibly Buckingham, had stormed out of the council meeting. Following the rumours of his possible murder, Gaunt retired to Pontefract, only obeying the King's summons to his presence early the next year, accompanied by a large and heavily-armed retinue.

France's increasing power threatened both English national pride and English economic interests, which needed to be defended. In 1384, de la Pole announced a royal expedition—although "he carefully refrained from saying where he or the council thought the King should go". The choice was made for them when the French sent Jean de Vienne to Scotland with an army the following year, with a force of about 1,300 men-at-arms and 250 crossbowmen, both to provide technical assistance and to encourage the Scottish to invade England while the French were victorious in France. In early June the following year, a council meeting in Reading selected Scotland as the young King's first campaign. The invasion was part of a broader and older policy of taking a robust stand against breaches of the truce, which the  contemporary Anonimalle Chronicle says was "badly kept" by Scotland. The King's uncle, John of Gaunt, had already led a small incursion into Scotland in spring 1384, with little success. He reached Edinburgh but no further, and this experience may have engendered a more conciliatory approach. He was well-disposed to the Scots generally and had recruited Scotsmen into his retinue. He also had personal reasons for wanting to avoid war with Scotland. Peace on the northern border would make it easier to further his plans in Iberia. Also, he had been treated most urbanely by the Scots on his previous visits. Indeed, during his visit in 1381, the Peasants' Revolt had erupted in England, and the Scots had given him refuge for ten days. Gaunt's policy, though, disintegrated with the arrival of de Vienne's forces in Scotland. It was not, however, necessarily a poorly-conceived strategy. If successful, it would neutralise the northern theatre of war and allow England to refocus on the French fleet at Sluys. According to James Gillespie: "it was a gamble, but a sensible gamble". Unfortunately trouble had been brewing on the domestic front for the previous year. Relations between the King and Gaunt had broken down, and the potential crisis was exacerbated by Richard's friends and close officials who wished to neutralise Gaunt's influence on policy. The invasion was one of several long itinerancies that Richard undertook during his reign; he left behind a caretaker government consisting of the Mayor of London, the Archbishop of Canterbury, the Bishop of London, Lord Cobham, and Sir Robert Knolles.

The French army in Scotland 
As part of their treaty with France, the Scots had reassurances that, were war to break out between Scotland and England, France would provide military assistance for Scotland. Gaunt's attempts at furthering peace between England and Scotland did not suit France at all. They were, says May McKisack, "eager to profit by England's domestic embarrassments". A small and somewhat unofficial French force–perhaps in the nature of an advance party–had arrived in Scotland in May 1384. Their arrival followed the fall of Lochmaben Castle, the "last English outpost along in the western borders", after its capture by the Scots. The loss of this castle, says Anthony Tuck, left Cumberland "more vulnerable than it had been for the past fifty years". It did, however, provide Richard's council with the perfect justification for invading Scotland rather than France.

The French invasion force under de Vienne consisted of 1,315 men-at-arms, 300 crossbowman, and 200 unspecified others (called "gross varlets" in the French records). Jonathan Sumption has estimated that "with the usual hangers-on" the force probably amounted to around 2,500 men. They brought with them horse, 600 suits of armour and other materiel—this for the use of the Scots—and gold florins worth 50,000 livres for Robert II. The fleet left Sluys on 22 March 1385 and arrived in Leith three days later. On 1 July, the French and Scottish battle captains signed articles of agreement (in French) in Edinburgh detailing the prosecution of their campaign. These were extremely detailed and ranged from their military ordinances to the reconnaissance procedures to be undertaken prior to besieging a castle. They appointed 23 July for the launch of their campaign, although the date was eventually brought forward to the 8th.

Preparation
The latest truce with Scotland was due to expire on 15 July 1385, and the fact that the English muster was due to take place on the 14th indicates that the plan was to invade immediately it had done so. Richard II was nearly eighteen, and the campaign was clearly intended to cast him—as a would-be conqueror of Scotland—in the same light as his father and grandfather. According to a modern commentator, it was, in contemporaries' eyes, "not just what a king would do but also what a man would do". He had, after all, been groomed from birth to follow in his father's footsteps, and this expedition was the point at which he demonstrated his royal independence. Anthony Goodman has suggested that apart from the obvious strategic necessity of the campaign, it had a secondary purpose in increasing Richard's military prestige and political profile, and indeed, says Sumption, "the presence of the English King...proved to be a powerful recruiting agent".

By 10 July the army had reached Nottingham. The court moved to York, where the first wages were paid to Gaunt for him and his army on 19 July. The King's army, with his tenants-in-chief, left there the following day; they were already nearly a week behind schedule, having arranged to be in Newcastle on the 14th. A final muster took place at Berwick-upon-Tweed.

The King's ordinances 
In Durham, military and naval ordinances were drawn up collectively by King Richard and his uncles, John of Gaunt (who was also Steward of England) and Thomas Mowbray (the latter having been appointed Earl Marshal on 30 June). and advised by various "wise knights" of the host.

The ordinances have been described as "the earliest extant code of discipline for an English army". Written in French, they consist of twenty-six discrete clauses. It was seen as necessary to remind the troops what they could and could not do during the offensive. The ordinances explicitly prohibited rape and sacrilege, for example. They also gave practical instructions, such as reminding naval ships to stick close to the Admiral in a storm, and guidance on punishments for soldiers' wrongdoing (the penalty for taking women and priests prisoner, for example, was to be death). They were necessary because the way of raising armies—for short periods and specific periods—meant that it was not possible to drill martial discipline into them, as would be possible with a standing army. By the later Middle Ages the Crown had established a "preference for the mobility and reliability of the paid professional" over the raising of the feudal tenantry. Armies were recruited and then disbanded, and there was no way of ensuring that men who had been bound by a previous set of regulations would be recruited again. The ordinances were promulgated on 17 July.

The feudal levy 
There was still a problem with financing. Although the parliament of November 1384 had granted the King a subsidy to fund a campaign, the Commons had done so on the impression that this was to be a continental campaign against the French; not a northern one against the Scots. The latter would be a breach of the Commons' wishes, which, while unwritten, were to be respected by any king who wanted good relations with that institution in future. They may, in fact, have generally approved of de la Pole's foreign policy as an alternative to the repeated, and heavy, taxes required by Edward III to prosecute his French wars.  The King claimed to have personally refused to touch what he had been granted, saying he had refused it "by his own special act, without the council or any other intervening". The King intended, though, that this be an invasion force of substance. It would have been one of the largest English armies organised in the 14th century, and the biggest ever raised in the whole of the Hundred Years' War. In the event, it was still an "unusually large one", going by contemporary estimates. An extant order of battle suggests there were around 14,000 men in the invading army, while Exchequer receipts indicate at least 12,000 men had been paid for war service in 1385, with at least 142 captains. Ironically, points out Keen, the nobility brought greater armies to the King's host than the traditional feudal summons would have obliged the lords to provide. 

Instead of using the subsidy, in June 1385 the King resorted to the old feudal due of scutage to raise funds. This could have raised the King around £12,000; "a six-week campaign", suggests Sumption, "could be expected to cost about £20,000".  Writs were sent to 56 tenants-in-chief on 13 June. They included a writ of array to the Bishop of Winchester which requested him to "arm and array all abbots, priors, men of religion and other ecclesiastical persons of his diocese", To some extent, this reflected Richard's desire to utilise the power of the Roman church in his campaign against Scotland, who—like France—supported the Antipope, Clement VII, and could thus be treated as schismatics. It also enabled the bishop to provide some degree of defence for the south coast of England. Like the others issued, this writ had no connection with feudal tenure. It was a normal commission of array such as was authorised under the Statute of Winchester. Richard's old tutor and household chamberlain had been appointed Constable of Dover Castle the previous year, also with the purpose of strengthening the defence of the region.

The levy was intended to alleviate the costs of the campaign to the Crown by using its barons and nobles as subcontractors. It would, in theory, save the government from having to pay them bonuses or ransoms, as was by now usual in royal campaigns. It may have had a secondary purpose of illustrating that the levy was still a viable option for the Crown. Edward I had never summoned one during his fifty-year reign; Richard's doing so in 1385 may have been an attempt to reaffirm the precedent. If this was the case, suggests Michael Prestwich, it would have ensured that the Crown would not "lose its right to demand such service in future". Jonathan Sumption, on the other hand, has questioned whether it was ever intended to be followed through with, and has suggested that it "may have been made as a prelude to a round of horse-trading". The policy caused such an uproar, however, that Richard was swiftly forced to withdraw the proposition. Indeed, he publicly denied—in parliament—that he had ever intended to enforce scutage. Sumption's theory is strengthened by the fact that, in return for the King dropping the claim to scutage, his captains agreed to waive their right to recruitment bonuses, which they could otherwise have claimed from the crown. Although it was never followed through, this summons was to be the last feudal levy of its kind in English history. Although its primary purpose was doubtless financial, Gillespie has drawn attention to the positive publicity that Richard may have expected to enjoy from summoning the feudal host to him: he would be truly Edward I's great-grandson. Men would serve, and be summoned to serve "not only cum servitio debito but quanto potentius poteritis", As it turned out, his financial impotence was exposed to all and sundry, especially to the shire knights in the Commons.

Invasion 

The campaign began poorly even before the English reached the border. In July, Ralph Stafford—son and heir of Hugh, Earl of Stafford and a knight of the royal household—was murdered. Somewhere between York and Bishopsthorpe, he was killed by Richard II's half-brother, the Earl of Huntingdon. It may have been an act of revenge by Huntingdon for the killing of one of his squires by someone in Ralph's retinue during a scuffle. Alternatively, it could have been a case of mistaken identity. Whatever its cause, says historian Carol Rawcliffe, the affair could potentially have threatened the entire campaign. It drew much commentary from political observers of the time. Huntingdon escaped to Lancashire, while Richard "in a paroxysm of rage and grief swore that his [half-] brother should be treated as a common murderer".

The army the King eventually gathered, then, had been recruited along contemporary bastard feudal lines rather than by a traditional, early-medieval reliance on scutage. Those who mustered in Newcastle did so under financial contract rather than tenurial bonds. The King and Gaunt, and their supporters were reconciled on the journey north. The English army arrived at Durham on 20 July, where the duke dined with Nottingham, Oxford and Salisbury. Just before the English army entered Scotland, Richard created his uncles Edmund and Thomas respectively Dukes of York and Gloucester. He also made his Lord Chancellor, de la Pole, the Earl of Suffolk.. Leading the army was Richard, and perhaps more realistically, his uncle John, Duke of Lancaster, who, as Goodman puts it, was "a military veteran, well-versed in Scottish campaigning, and well-acquainted with Scottish magnates". Richard, on the other hand, never developed a gift for command, relying in Scotland (as he later would in Ireland) on the advice of a small group of trusted individuals.

The army that Richard led to Scotland was a large one. Apart from the King and Gaunt, most of the senior English nobility took part. The Earls of Buckingham and Nottingham commanded the army's vanguard with Gaunt. Arundel and Warwick, under the King, commanded the central battle. Accompanying Gaunt—but with his own retinue—was his son, Henry, Earl of Derby. Assessing the numbers involved, Anthony Goodman suggests that Buckingham had brought 400 men-at-arms and twice that number of archers. Arundel and Nottingham, he says, brought, between them, nearly 200 men-at-arms and 300 archers, while the Earl of Warwick had around 120 of the former and 160 of the latter. Sir Henry Percy, son of the Earl of Northumberland, brought sixty men-at-arms and the same number of archers. De Vere too, brought a "substantial" force. But their combined total of nearly 2,000 men was still massively outnumbered by John of Gaunt's force, which was in the region of 3,000 men. Richard did not solely call upon his nobility either. Gillespie has pointed out that about 10% of the entire host—around 450 men-at-arms and 500 archers—were under the direct command, not of barons, but of the king's officers. These were of the civil service ("the chancellor, treasurer, keeper of the privy seal") or household ("secretary, steward of the household, under-chamberlain of the household, and controller of the wardrobe"). Also included in the royal army were members of the Queen's Household (for example, Henry Burzebo and Henry Hask of Bohemia), as well as Spaniards and Welshmen. The army that crossed the Scottish border on 6 August 1385 bore 38 royal standards and over 90 bearing the arms of St. George's, and the flag of St Cuthbert was borne before it. Ultimately, Richard led an army of about 14,000 men from nearly every peer of England, with over two-thirds of them being archers.

English invasion 
The army crossed into Scotland over the central borders. Along this route lay the abbeys of Dryburgh, Melrose and Newbattle. These were burned (an action justified by Scotland's–and thus these abbeys'–support for the so-called Anti-pope, Clement VII). The English claimed these schismatics' abbeys were used for military purposes, and were legitimate targets. Arson, Anne Curry has noted, was explicitly not prohibited under the army's ordinances. The army reached Edinburgh on 11 August. It also was assaulted and pillaged, and "suffered its full share of calamities attendant upon these disastrous wars". It was at least partially burned, and Musselburgh Hospital was severely damaged. English strategy, says Nigel Saul, was to be "the traditional one employed by the English in Scotland: to draw their adversaries into battle at the earliest opportunity and to crush them by sheer weight of numbers". The Scottish, however, recognised this for the trap it was, and were not to be brought to the field. Instead, they withdrew into the hillsides, and lived off the land; this likewise ensured that little remained for the English army to forage. The French, says Scottish historian Ranald Nicholson, viewed their allies with dismay. Their preferred tactic was, like that of the English, the pitched battle, at which they could win honour and glory. However, even de Vienne soon came to understand that the Scottish policy was the only one likely to be effective. The English army resorted to pillaging for sustenance, and destroyed much of Lothian, although this was in part caused by the Scots' own scorched earth policy as they withdrew ahead of the English. The English army showed little quarter, executing captured Scottish prisoners rather than the more usual practice of ransoming them.

On 11 August 1385 the English army entered Edinburgh, which was deserted by then. Three days earlier Richard had received news from London that his mother, Joan, Countess of Kent—with whom Richard was very close—had died the previous day. Most of Edinburgh was set alight, including St Giles' Kirk. It appears that the only reason Holyrood Palace escaped similar treatment was that Gaunt himself ordered it not to be touched, possibly on account of the hospitality that had previously been shown there. Holyrood was to be an exception. According to the contemporary chronicler Andrew of Wyntoun, for the rest, the English army was given "free and uninterrupted play [for] slaughter, rapine and fire-raising all along a six-mile front". There appears to have been indecision amongst the English military command whether to proceed or withdraw. Divisions between Richard's supporters and his uncle, only superficially healed at Durham, were re-opened. Food continued to be in short supply, and it was rumoured that Vienne and his Franco-Scottish army was invading England via the West March. Contemporary chroniclers were themselves confused as to what was happening deep in Scotland. Jean Froissart, for example, suggests that John of Gaunt advocated a swift interceptive attack on Vienne, while the Westminster Chronicle says he pushed for continuing the advance into Scotland.

This disagreement was very much moulded by the jealousies and distrust that existed between Gaunt and Richard's supporters. First, if Gaunt did recommend pushing deeper into Scotland, Richard rejected it as a course of action (probably, says Goodman, on the "reasonable logistical rounds that victuals were scarce and it was likely to lead to starvation among the common soldiers"). According to the Westminster monk, Richard then harshly criticised the duke, saying "many shameful things" about him, even accusing him of treason. Froissart, on the other hand, says that Gaunt advocated a march across the Pennines to intercept the Franco-Scots force. Richard, though, was told by the Earl of Oxford that the reason Gaunt promoted this was to procure the King's death on what would certainly be a hazardous journey. Again, Richard robustly rejected Gaunt's suggestion, telling him that "if he wanted to go south-west, [Gaunt] would be on his own", as the King and his men were returning to London.

English withdrawal 
Richard has generally been considered by historians as being irresponsible for rejecting Gaunt's advice, as the most experienced of his captains. Anthony Steel, though, posits that Richard was probably sensible to reject Gaunt's plan to "fling himself into the Highlands in a hopeless search for the enemy". This had, after all, effectively been Gaunt's strategy for his short campaign of the previous year, which had also achieved little of value. "Gaunt, who had some experience of Scotland", says Tuck, "must have appreciated this point", The King seems to have been particularly concerned for the well-being of the troops. He told Gaunt—according to the Westminster Chronicle—"though you and the other lords might have plenty of food for yourselves, the rest, the humbler, and lowlier members of our army, would certainly not find such a wealth of victuals as would prevent their dying of hunger", In the event, no offensive option was taken. The English commanders agreed on a withdrawal, which began around 17 August; before they left, Richard and Gaunt were once again reconciled. The royal army's line of retreat was guarded by Hotspur, who deflected various Scottish flank attacks. Three days later, the King was in Newcastle, and within the fortnight he was back in Westminster. The main army may have taken longer to return.

French incursion 
The expedition, says Gillespie, had singularly  "failed to live up to the careful preparations" which had preceded it, and had spent less than a fortnight in enemy territory. The reports of a Franco-Scottish raid into the north-west of England, on the other hand, turned out to be true. On 8 July a force of French knights journeyed south from Edinburgh; they wore black surcoats with white St Andrew's crosses sewn on. with them were around 3,000 Scottish soldiers. Led by de Vienne and James, Earl of Douglas, alongside the latter's cousin Archibald, Lord of Galloway and possibly George Dunbar, Earl of March, much of Cumberland was plundered. The invaders reached as far as the walls of Carlisle, from the border, on 7 September. This was repulsed by a counterattack from Henry Hotspur,  although the contemporary chronicler Henry Knighton preferred to record how the Scottish army withdrew, panicking, after the Virgin Mary appeared before them in defence of Carlisle. According to Froissart, when the invaders raided the wealthy English bishoprics of Carlisle and Durham, they boasted of stealing more from them alone than was held within the whole Kingdom of Scotland. The Franco-Scottish force considered an assault on Roxburgh Castle, but decided against it as almost impossible. Wark Castle, however, was a different matter. This had suffered years of neglect and was a state of severe disrepair as well as damage from previous Scottish attacks. Another argument took place as to whether to assault it before, as Sumption puts it, the French attacked "on their own as the Scots stood by and watched". The castle was eventually taken after two days bitter fighting, with heavy losses for the French and Wark's defenders only driven from its walls by hand-to-hand fighting. The garrison was put to the sword, the captain held for ransom, and the castle's wooden outbuildings razed.

Franco-Scottish divisions 
 The French, meanwhile, had as Sumption puts it, encountered "unexpected difficulties" with their hosts. They had intended to immediately commence border raids, but "found the Scots uncooperative". In the event, no raiding took place until 8 July

Relations between them deteriorated rapidly. This was partly due to strategic differences. For example, following the incursion into the West March, the decision was taken to swing eastward. The Scottish wished to lay siege to Roxburgh Castle, but de Vienne, anxious not to endanger his knights if he could avoid it, insisted that if it was captured, it would be a French prize. These terms were unacceptable to the Scots, and the assault did not occur. Their different approaches were also provoked by their very different experiences of how a war with the English was best fought: 

Relations were further soured because of the contempt the French held their hosts in. The French knights were dismayed at the "primitiveness" of both the land and the people: "What Prussian march is this to which our Admiral has taken us?" they moaned.

The French complained about everything from the size of their dwelling quarters to the hardness of the beds they slept in to the quality of the beer and food. Relations worsened when the knights, as was customary, sent their servants out to forage from the land and villages. This custom went down poorly with the locals, who often retaliated violently, and, in some cases, killed the French foragers. Where the French did find Scots willing to trade with them, they regularly complained at being exorbitantly over-charged.

For the Scots, says Sumption, "the resentment was mutual". Although the Scottish leaders—the King, of course, and his lords, such as the Earls of Douglas and Moray—respected the French as peers, the Scots generally were hostile to this group of foreigners who could not speak their language and who damaged their crops by riding warhorses many abreast. The acrimony over the assault on Wark Castle had made things worse. Even after the English withdrawal, the Scots refused to allow the French to leave until they had satisfactorily compensated their hosts for the damage they had caused. To this end, de Vienne was effectively kept hostage until money was sent from Paris to meet their demands. In the event, he was unable to depart until mid-November 1385, even though his army had left early the previous month. When de Vienne did leave Scotland, posits McKisack, it "was less due to English activity than to French distaste for living conditions in Scotland": de Vienne had described the country as containing nothing but "wild beasts, forests and mountains".

Aftermath

John of Gaunt remained in the north after the King returned to England to oversee the new truce with Scotland; their relationship was worse than it had ever been. Alienating his uncle was to prove a tactical error over the next few years when Richard found himself increasingly opposed by his barons. Nigel Saul has suggested that the Scottish expedition left the south coast exposed to a French attack, and, indeed, a French navy was being assembled at Sluys that same year. Although the invasion—widely expected in England—did not materialise, it cast a pall over the parliament which assembled in October 1386. Combined with the poor reception of Richard's attempt to reintroduce scutage, there was deep-seated indignation among members of the two Houses over unfair and extravagant benefitting on the part of the King's favourite, the Chancellor, Michael de la Pole, recently made 1st Earl of Suffolk, from the monarch's largesse.  These were the prevailing sentiments going into the year's fractious parliament, during which the removal of the Chancellor was sought as a prerequisite before any request for funds would be heard.

Richard's 1385 campaign was considered generally a failure (G. L. Harriss called it "ignominious" and May McKisack, "inglorious"). Tuck wrote that seen as a "punitive raid", it was arguably a success. The Scots were sufficiently persuaded to accept truces for the next three years. This, says Steel, was a far more positive result for the campaign than it has generally been noted: as "southern Scotland had been wasted so effectively that there was no more danger from the north for another three years". James Gillespie has highlighted the King's character traits that were to be revealed in 1385. The chevauchée, he suggests, indicates "a headstrong ruler determined to exact vengeance on the Scots" although the King later made Melrose Abbey a grant towards its rebuilding. Similarly, Richard II's concern for the well-being of the ordinary soldiers is, he says, an early indicator of the "remarkable concern...that would later endear the King to his Cheshire guard". It depends on the King's priorities, explains MacDonald. If Richard had a secondary, punitive purpose to the invasion—i.e. punishing the Scots when he could not defeat them—"and the chronicle accounts provide some corroboration of this", Tuck, too, has remarked upon Richard's "unusual sensitivity" and compares it to a similar sensitivity demonstrated towards the rebelling peasants of 1381. Richard's main problem in the aftermath of the campaign, says Gillespie, was one of the perceptions with which he was held after the campaign. Although it may have been more successful than it appeared at first glance, Richard singularly failed to match up to the image of the successful warrior king as epitomised by his father and grandfather. Some good news came from the Iberian Peninsula, then racked by a civil war over the War of the Castilian Succession. Gaunt had been persuaded by the news of a Castilian defeat that he should enter the dynastic contest, and the following year he led an army to make his claim. His absence from English politics was enough with hindsight, says Anthony Steel, as "a turning point in Richard's reign". In March 1386, Richard recognised Gaunt as King of Castille and was probably as keen for Gaunt to go as Gaunt was to be gone. In 2004, Simon Walker wrote, "Richard was even prepared to speed Gaunt on his way by advancing a loan of 20,000 marks to defray the costs of the expedition". In 1962, Steel wrote that Gaunt's absence upset the balance of power within the political community and "liberated forces which had hitherto been more or less under control".

The ordinances that King Richard issued before the campaign were later the basis of those issued by King Henry V before his 1415 French campaign. Although Henry's contained nearly twice the number of clauses as Richard's, twenty out of Henry's first twenty-three were copies of those of Richard. A similar instrument of summons was used by King Henry VII in 1492 to raise the army that briefly invaded Brittany and those as late as 1585—when Elizabeth I ordered the invasion of the Low Countries—were clearly modelled on those of 200 years earlier. Richard's ordinances not only provided a blueprint for these later summonses, but, says Maurice Keen, "remained the principal means of recruitment of royal hosts, and influenced the regulation of armies even longer",

Richard planned ("though in vain") another invasion of Scotland in 1389, and mirroring this, there were complaints to the end of Richard's reign that the Scots regularly violated the truce. The next occasions on which Richard invaded a foreign country was in 1394 and 1399, when he invaded Ireland; during the latter invasion Richard II was deposed by, Gaunt's son, Bolingbroke, who took the throne as Henry IV.

Notes

References

Bibliography

 
 
 
 
 
 
 
 
 
 
 
 
 
 
 
 
 
 
 
 
 
 
 
 
 
 
 
 
 
 
 
 
 
 
 
 
 
 
 
 

1385 in Scotland
1385 in England
England–Scotland relations
Invasions by England
Anglo-Scottish border
Warfare in medieval Scotland
English invasion
Invasion of Scotland
Invasions of Scotland